Ognjen Kržić (born 13 March 1969) is a water polo player from Croatia, who was a member of the national team that won the silver medal at the 1996 Summer Olympics in Atlanta, Georgia.

See also
 List of Olympic medalists in water polo (men)

References

External links
 

1969 births
Living people
Croatian male water polo players
Olympic silver medalists for Croatia in water polo
Water polo players at the 1996 Summer Olympics
Water polo players at the 2000 Summer Olympics
Medalists at the 1996 Summer Olympics